1963–64 Kuwaiti Premier League was the 3rd season of the First League Division.

Overview
In the third season, it almost witnessed the end of Al Arabi's monopoly on the title after a great competition with Al-Qadsia and the participation of the same six teams in the previous season. Al-Arabi and Al-Qadsia were equal on points after Al-Qadsia inflicted the first defeat of Al-Arabi 2–0 in the last match in the league, and they were equal on points with 18 points for both teams, with Al-Arabi an advantage by goal difference. In the deciding match to determine the league champion, Al-Arabi managed to maintain its title after defeating Al-Qadsia 2–1 to achieve the third title in a row, scoring 42 goals and conceding 9 goals.

League table

Championship play-off

References
RSSSF

Kuwait Premier League seasons
Kuwait
football